Väinö is a masculine given name found most commonly in  Finland and may refer to:
Väinö Auer (1895–1981), Finnish geologist and geographer
Väinö Bremer (1899–1964), Finnish biathlete and modern pentathlete and Olympic competitor
Väinö Broman (born 1932), Finnish sports shooter
Väinö Eskola (1894–1952), Finnish sprinter
Väinö Hakkila (1882–1958), Finnish politician 
Väinö Heikkilä (1888–1943), Finnish track and field athlete
Väinö Heusala (1914–1982), Finnish sports shooter
Väinö Huhtala (1935-2016), Finnish cross-country skier and Olympic medalist
Väinö Hupli (1886–1934), Finnish journalist and politician
Väinö Ikonen (1895–1954), Finnish wrestler and Olympic medalist
Väinö E. Jokinen (1879–1920), Finnish journalist and politician
Väinö Kajander (1893–1978) Finnish wrestler and Olympic medalist
Väinö Kallio (1897–1938), Finnish politician
Väinö Kohtanen (1889–1963),  Finnish evangelist, President of the Seventh-day Adventist Church in Finland
Väinö Kokkinen (1899–1967), Finnish wrestler and Olympic medalist
Väinö Korhonen (born 1926), Finnish modern pentathlete and fencer and Olympic medalist
Väinö Koskela (1921-2016), Finnish former long-distance runner and Olympic competitor
Väinö Kirstinä (1936–2007), Finnish writer 
Väinö Kivilinna (1875–1950), Finnish politician 
Väinö Kuisma (1934–2015) Finnish javelin thrower
Väinö Kunnas (1896–1929), Finnish Expressionist painter
Väinö Lassila (1896–1939), Finnish professor and human rights activist
Väinö Lehmus (1886–1936), Finnish actor
Väinö Leskinen (1917–1972), Finnish politician, parliamentarian
Väinö Liikkanen (1903–1957), Finnish cross-country skier and Olympic medalist 
Väinö Linna (1920–1992), Finnish author
Väinö Mäkelä (1921–1982), Finnish long-distance runner and Olympic competitor 
Väinö Malmivaara (1879–1958), Finnish Lutheran Bishop and politician
Väinö Markkanen (born 1929), Finnish sports shooter and Olympic medalist
Väinö Meltti (1898–1964), Finnish politician 
Väinö Merivirta (1892–1937), Finnish politician 
Väinö Myllyrinne (1909–1963), Finnish acromegalic giant and one time world's tallest person
Väinö Muinonen (1898–1978), Finnish long-distance runner and Olympic competitor
Väinö Nyström (1857–1918), Finnish politician
Väinö Pastell (1881–1949), Finnish politician
Väinö Penttala (1897–1976), Finnish wrestler and Olympic medalist
Väinö Rainio (1896–1979), Finnish track and field athlete
Väinö Raitio (1891–1945), Finnish composer
Väinö Rankila (1911–1970), Finnish politician 
Väinö Salovaara (1888–1964), Finnish chief engineer and politician
Väinö Siikaniemi (1887–1932), Finnish athlete, javelin thrower and Olympic medalist 
Väinö Sipilä (1897–1987), Finnish long-distance runner
Väinö Skarp (1908–1981), Finnish sports shooter
Väinö Suvivuo 1917–1985), Finnish hurdler 
Väinö Tanner (1881–1966), Finnish politician, Prime Minister of Finland 
Väinö Tanner (1881–1948), Finnish geographer and diplomat
Väinö Tiiri (1886–1966), Finnish gymnast and Olympic medalist 
Väinö Valve (1895—1995), Finnish general and navy commander 
Väinö Voionmaa (1869-1947), Finnish professor, politician, parliamentarian and chancellor 

Finnish masculine given names